Daniel Ayora (born 23 June 1964) is a Peruvian backstroke swimmer. He competed in two events at the 1980 Summer Olympics.

References

External links
 

1964 births
Living people
Peruvian male backstroke swimmers
Olympic swimmers of Peru
Swimmers at the 1980 Summer Olympics
Place of birth missing (living people)